Fortunat Alojzy Gonzaga Żółkowski, Ziółkowski (2 November 1777 – 11 September 1822), was a Polish actor, comedist, adaptor, translator, editor of humour magazines, and head of a Polish theatrical family. He was born near Nowogródek (now Navahrudak, Belarus). He performed at Teatr Narodowy. He was the father of Alojzy Gonzaga Jazon Żółkowski and Nepomucena Kostecka.

He died in Warsaw.

Notable roles

 Miechodmuch Cud mniemany, czyli Krakowiacy i górale
 Kartofel Gaweł na księżycu
 Lurwell Henryk VI na łowach
 Szafarz Tadeusz Chwalibóg
 Baron Kopciuszek
 Pustak Fircyk w zalotach
 Kopp Młodość Henryka V
 Don Bartolo Cyrulik sewilski (P. Beaumarchais)
 Polkwicer Nasze przedbiegi
 Lisiewicz Pan Geldhab (A. Fredro)
 main roles in Molière's Mieszczanin szlachcicem, Doktor z musu, Georges Dandin and Anzelm in Szkoła kobiet

References
 

Polish male stage actors
Polish translators
1777 births
1822 deaths
19th-century Polish male actors
18th-century Polish–Lithuanian male actors